The 1933 Texas Mines Miners football team, sometimes known as the "Muckers", was an American football team that represented Texas School of Mines (now known as the University of Texas at El Paso) as an independent during the 1933 college football season. In its fifth season under head coach Mack Saxon, the team compiled a 3–5–1 record and was outscored by a total of 85 to 71.

Schedule

References

Texas Mines
UTEP Miners football seasons
Texas Mines Miners football